Sofia Pavlovna Soboleva (1840 – October 27, 1884) was a Russian writer who used the pseudonym V. Samoilovich.

Biography
Soboleva was born in Shlisselburg, where her father was an engineer. She was educated at home until the age of eight, and then sent to Madame Kamerat's Pension in St Petersburg. Soboleva began publishing her works in her early twenties. Her early story Pros and Cons was published while she was working in the editorial offices of Otechestvennye Zapiski. After her marriage to a civil servant fell apart, she supported herself by working as a private teacher.

From 1867 she turned to children's writing and journalistic work, and was involved in the publication of several early children's journals. Her works were popular, but her financial circumstances remained difficult due to her adopting and caring for a number of poor children. She died in St Petersburg in 1884.

English translations
Pros and Cons, from An Anthology of Russian Women's Writing, Oxford, 1994.

References

1840 births
1884 deaths
People from Shlisselburg
People from Shlisselburgsky Uyezd
Journalists from the Russian Empire
Russian children's writers
Pseudonymous women writers
Short story writers from the Russian Empire
Russian women children's writers
19th-century journalists from the Russian Empire
Women writers from the Russian Empire
Writers from the Russian Empire
19th-century short story writers from the Russian Empire
19th-century pseudonymous writers